Flux Gourmet is a 2022 black comedy film written and directed by Peter Strickland and starring Fatma Mohamed, Gwendoline Christie, Makis Papadimitriou, and Asa Butterfield.

Synopsis
A trio of experimental performance artists, known for their process of "sonic catering" (where they extract disturbing sounds from various foods) take up residency at a remote artistic institution, run by a wealthy, enigmatic director who is funding the project. The group is led by a narcissistic, controlling woman named Elle. A self-described "hack" journalist named Stones is hired to document the day-to-day activities of the group, while dealing with unpleasant gastrointestinal disorders, for which tests are being administered by an on-site doctor. As Stones documents the artistic collective's power struggles, vendettas, rehearsals, performances, and sordid history, he increasingly becomes a participant in the artistic proceedings.

Cast
 Asa Butterfield as Billy Rubin 
 Gwendoline Christie as Jan Stevens
 Ariane Labed as Lamina Propria 
 Fatma Mohamed as Elle di Elle 
 Makis Papadimitriou as Stones 
 Leo Bill as Technical Assistant Wim 
 Richard Bremmer as Dr Glock

Production
Filming wrapped in July 2021.

Release
In July 2021, it was announced that IFC Films acquired North American distribution rights to the film.  It premiered at the Berlin Film Festival on February 11, 2022. It also made it to 'World Cinema' section of 27th Busan International Film Festival to be screened in October 2022.

Reception

Box office
In the United States and Canada, the film earned $3,780 from 19 theaters in its opening weekend. It made $1,397 from six theaters the following weekend, and $4,387 in its third.

Critical response
The film has an 85% approval rating on Rotten Tomatoes based on 80 reviews, with a weighted average of 7.1/10. The site's consensus states, "Flux Gourmet isn't for all tastes, but viewers attuned to writer-director Peter Strickland's unique wavelength will find this horror-laced satire a savory delight". On Metacritic, the film had a weighted average score of 80 out of 100, based on 21 critics, indicating "universal acclaim."

Pat Brown of Slant Magazine awarded the film two and a half stars out of four and wrote, "That being said, Strickland’s playful mockery of performance art and excessively serious-minded “collectives” feels both insular and, at times, a shade too flavorless." David Ehrlich of IndieWire graded the film a B+ and wrote, "As usual, Strickland has made a sumptuous meal out of social impropriety — a strange cinematic delicacy about the discomforts that need to be shared so that others don’t have to be stomached." Matthew Joseph Jenner of the International Cinephile Society awarded the film four and a half out of five stars, writing "Flux Gourmet is an absolute triumph, best enjoyed by those who accept that Strickland’s work is undeniably an acquired taste, but one that offers a truly unforgettable experience, one that may even tempt us to go back for a second serving."

Peter Debruge of Variety gave the film a negative review and wrote, "In fact, Flux Gourmet may well send audiences running for the loo, or else reaching for the barf bag, coming about as close to triggering the gag reflex as a film can without actually jamming a finger down your throat." Leslie Felperin of The Hollywood Reporter gave the film a positive review and wrote, "Nevertheless, Strickland builds his own worlds with such a distinctive style — down to the fonts, the bilious shades of green and the textures of the silks — that the viewer can’t help feeling pulled into his crazy maelstrom of quirk." Peter Bradshaw of The Guardian awarded the film three stars out of five and wrote, "Flux Gourmet may yet have a claim to cult-favourite status, but Strickland has given us a stronger, realer taste in the past." Anna Smith of Deadline Hollywood gave the film a positive review and wrote, "Strickland has delivered another delicious character-driven drama that balances the amusingly surreal with the uncomfortably real — and it’s a wild and witty ride."

References

External links
 

2020s English-language films
2020s American films
2020s British films
2020s satirical films
2022 black comedy films
American avant-garde and experimental films
American black comedy films
American drama films
American satirical films
British avant-garde and experimental films
British black comedy films
British drama films
British satirical films
Films about artists
Films about food and drink
Films about musical groups
Films directed by Peter Strickland
Films set in England
Films shot in Yorkshire
IFC Films films